Acton Park may refer to one of several places:

Acton Park, Wrexham, a residential area in Wales
Acton Park, Western Australia, a small town near Busselton
Acton Park, Tasmania, a suburb east of Hobart, Australia
Acton Park, London, a park in West London, United Kingdom